Jack Richard Peterson is an American media personality and former, self-proclaimed representative of an incel community known for hate speech and misogyny named incels.me.  

Certain media outlets describe Jack as a spokesperson for incels.me during April 2018, while the Daily Beast describes him as unpopular within incels.me and also at one point sanctioned by incels.me staff during April 2018.  During his involvement with the forum and after his alleged forum departure in May 2018, he became an on-off media personality on the subject of incels from 2018-2021. 

After the 2018 Toronto van attack, Jack disavowed misogynistic incels.me members and spoke out against hate speech in media interviews, eventually claiming to have left all incel communities entirely.  Years later, he appeared on television and claimed he was against women's rights broadly.

Incel communities activity

incels.me activity
Peterson has claimed in media interviews to have been a minor staff member of incels.me, and presented himself as an incels.me spokesperson during April 2018. Journalist Mandy Stadtmiller paints a different picture.  During April 2018, while Jack was still a member of the incels.me forum, Mandy writes that Jack was banned by incels.me staff from the incels.me public chat room, before Jack made a 30 minute PowerPoint video to be let back in.  According to Mandy, Jack was also insulted as a 'status-seeker' and an 'opportunist' by the incels.me community for attempting to represent their community and trying to paint the incels.me forum in a positive light.

Departure from incels.me
Jack subsequently began portraying incels in general in a more negative light, describing many as 'entitled' and stating he changed his mind about the hate speech on the incels.me forum being 'ironic'.  During May 2018, Peterson announced on his YouTube channel that he left incels.me voluntarily by requesting a permanent ban on incels.me. He appeared on Invisibilia in April 2019 stating he was in the process of changing in whatever way he could to "make my life not horrible".

Peterson made an appearance on ABC News Nightline in August 2019, discussing his departure from the incel community.

Incel podcast
He previously ran the "Incelcast", wherein he interviewed incels and discussed how they came to their position. His podcast also discussed the hikikomori phenomenon in Japan and the likelihood of the same thing happening in the Western world.

Views on incels
He believes that involuntary celibacy is a social phenomenon rather than a movement and has described online communities as support groups for discussing depression and loneliness. Peterson describes incels as commonly being males in their late teens who are shy. 

Peterson has compared the demonization of inceldom to the generalizations and subsequent xenophobic and Islamophobic sentiments faced by Muslims in the aftermath of Islamist violence.

Personal life

Peterson's birth name is Kalerthon Demetro.

Peterson first stumbled upon the manosphere at the age of 11 on 4chan. A psychiatrist has diagnosed him as suffering from paranoid schizophrenia, but this has been disputed by other doctors.

Education
According to the Daily Beast, Peterson dropped out of High School.  He subsequently attended the Chicago Academy for the Arts and dropped out during the first semester.

Relationships
Despite claiming to be incel, Peterson has stated that he has had a girlfriend in the past, yet claims it was not a productive relationship.  By Peterson's own admission he hacked his girlfriend's emails, distributed revenge porn of her, and was attacked by her after traveling to her city of residence unannounced and repeatedly attempting to contact her.

Missing persons report
Peterson was reported missing in December 2019, but was quickly located.

Dr. Phil appearance
In September 2021, Peterson appeared on the Dr. Phil show, claiming he hates women so much he decided to start dating a man.

References

External links
Jack Peterson's channel on YouTube
 
 Official blog

1998 births
Living people
People from Chicago
People from Illinois